Ettrokro (also spelled Etroukro) is a town in east-central Ivory Coast. It is a sub-prefecture and commune of Daoukro Department in Iffou Region, Lacs District.

In 2014, the population of the sub-prefecture of Ettrokro was 16,492.

Villages
The 11 villages of the sub-prefecture of Ettrokro and their population in 2014 are:

References

Sub-prefectures of Iffou
Communes of Iffou